"Spin" is a song by American alternative rock band Lifehouse from their second studio album, Stanley Climbfall (2002). It was written by Jason Wade and produced by Ron Aniello. The song received positive reviews from music critics and peaked at number 71 on the US Billboard Hot 100 chart. It was a top-thirty success in New Zealand, reaching number 25 on the RIANZ Singles Chart in January 2003.

Background
"Spin" is four minutes and 52 seconds long. It was produced by Ron Aniello. Jason Wade, the band's vocalist, wrote the song when he was 16.

Release
"Spin" was the first track on Lifehouse's album Stanley Climbfall, which was released on August 17, 2002. It was also the first single from the album.

Critical reception
The song received positive critical reviews. Gene Stout of the Seattle Post-Intelligencer described it as "an anthemic tune with a strong hook and a big guitar sound." Billboard's Chuck Taylor wrote that "'Spin' is a wonderfully constructed rock song with a number of different musical subsections, all of which showcase the potent pipes and song-writing skills of lead singer/guitarist Jason Wade ... Lifehouse has managed to drum up a keen balance between pure, guitar-fueled rock and hook-sodden, creatively executed pop – and this song deserves a lengthy stay on the playlists of both formats."

Chart performance
"Spin" spent 14 weeks on the US Billboard Hot 100 chart and peaked at number 71. The song also peaked at number 13 on the Adult Top 40, number 34 on the Mainstream Rock chart, and number 25 on the Modern Rock Tracks chart. In New Zealand, it peaked at number 25 on the RIANZ Singles Chart in January 2003. It also charted in Australia, Germany, the Netherlands, and the United Kingdom. In the latter country, it debuted and peaked at number five on the UK Rock Chart.

Music video
The song's music video was directed by Dave Meyers and was shot in Los Angeles in August 2002. It features scenes in various people's lives along with performances by the band.

Charts

Release history

References

2002 singles
2002 songs
DreamWorks Records singles
Lifehouse (band) songs
Music videos directed by Dave Meyers (director)
Song recordings produced by Ron Aniello
Songs written by Jason Wade
Songs written by Ron Aniello